Shravan Kshetra is a Hindu pilgrimage centre in Akbarpur, Ambedkar Nagar District, Uttar Pradesh, India. It is located at the confluence of Tamsa  and Visui rivers. According to local tradition, it is the place where Dasharatha, the father of Rama, killed Shravan.

References 

Ambedkar Nagar district
Hindu pilgrimage sites in India
Places in the Ramayana